Liolaemus lutzae, called commonly Lutz's tree iguana, is a species of lizard in the family Liolaemidae. The species is endemic to Brazil.

Etymology
The specific name, lutzae, is in honor of Brazilian herpetologist Bertha Lutz.

Geographic range
L. lutzae is found in the Brazilian states of Guanabara and Rio de Janeiro.

Habitat
The natural habitat of L. lutzae is sandy shores.

Reproduction
L. lutzae is oviparous.

Conservation status
L. lutzae is threatened by habitat loss.

References

Further reading
Mertens R (1938). "Bemerkungen über die brasilianischen Arten der Gattung Liolaemus". Zoologischer Anzeiger 123: 220–222. (Liolaemus lutzae, new species, p. 221). (in German).

Lizards of South America
Reptiles of Brazil
lutzae
Endemic fauna of Brazil
Taxa named by Robert Mertens
Reptiles described in 1938
Taxonomy articles created by Polbot